The rivalry between Chelsea and Leeds United is a football rivalry between London-based club Chelsea and Yorkshire-based Leeds United. The rivalry first emerged in the 1960s after a series of fiercely contested and controversial matches, when the two clubs were frequently involved in the pursuit of domestic and European honours culminating in the 1970 FA Cup Final, which is regarded as one of the most physical matches in English football history.

The perceived contrast between the clubs also fuelled the rivalry, summed up as "Yorkshire grit versus flash Cockney." The rivalry between the clubs often spilled out onto the terraces: at the height of British football hooliganism in the 1970s and 1980s, Chelsea's Headhunters and Leeds' Service Crew were among the most notorious football firms and had numerous violent encounters with each other. Hooliganism has been effectively curtailed since the 1990s and the rivalry has since declined.

In the Official Chelsea Biography, Leeds were cited as one of Chelsea's major rivalries. However, Leeds' relegation from the Premier League in 2004 had effectively ended the rivalry; the clubs only met once in sixteen years afterwards. The clubs met again in the 2020–21 Premier League season, as Leeds United was promoted after winning the EFL Championship in 2019–20. The first such meeting ended in a 3–1 Chelsea victory at Stamford Bridge on 5 December 2020, and evidence of the rivalry resurfaced. In the 2003 Football Fans Census, while Leeds fans named Chelsea as their second-biggest rivals, behind Manchester United, Chelsea fans consider Arsenal to be their main rivals, followed by a rivalry with Tottenham Hotspur and Manchester United.

History

Early years
Chelsea were founded in 1905, Leeds United in 1919. Both teams flitted between the First and Second Divisions in their early years, and neither won a major trophy prior to World War II. The clubs first met in a competitive match in the Second Division on 10 December 1927; Leeds won 5–0. Leeds also won 3–2 in the return fixture at Stamford Bridge that season to clinch promotion back to Division One. In 1952, they contested a gruelling fifth round FA Cup tie which took three matches to produce a winner, Chelsea eventually prevailed 5–1 in a second replay at Villa Park. An aggregate crowd of almost 150,000 watched the three matches and such was the fearsome tackling on display, Chelsea had to make seven changes to their line-up for a subsequent match.

1960s
It was in the 1960s that a significant rivalry first emerged between the clubs. Under the management of Don Revie, Leeds became a force in English football for the first time, capped by winning the league title in 1969. Chelsea, too, had enjoyed a renaissance under Tommy Docherty and also challenged for honours in the 1960s. Over the next decade, they would meet in numerous important, and fiercely contested, matches. Chelsea goalkeeper Peter Bonetti opined that the rivalry between the teams emerged because "Leeds had a name, a reputation as being dirty... [and] We matched them in the physical side of things because we had our own players who were physical... We weren't unalike in the way we played." Tommy Baldwin said, "There were a lot of scores being settled from previous games whenever we played them. It always just seemed to go mad, with everyone kicking each other." Norman Hunter said that he and Chelsea striker Peter Osgood shared a "tremendous rivalry." It was often rumoured that Osgood was top of the list in Jack Charlton's infamous "black book" of players he intended to exact revenge on, although Charlton himself stated that it was actually another, unnamed, Chelsea player. Johnny Giles recalled the "special sort of animosity" between the teams and his "previous" with Eddie McCreadie.

The rivalry was also fuelled by the traditional North-South divide in England, and by the clubs having markedly different images and philosophies. Chelsea were associated with the fashionable King's Road and celebrities like Raquel Welch and Steve McQueen. Leeds were perceived as a cynical, albeit talented, side with a style which some observers regarded as "dirty." Damien Blake of When Saturday Comes wrote that "Chelsea were The Beatles (attractive, clean-cut, fashionable) to Leeds' Stones (surly, violent, sexy, going out with Marianne Faithfull)" According to John King, "Leeds were... portrayed as dour Yorkshiremen with a reputation for playing dirty... Chelsea, on the other hand, were the wide boys of London, dedicated followers of fashion. While Leeds were drinking tea and playing cards, Chelsea were out boozing and chasing girls [but] when it came to games between the two, however, war was declared."

In 1964–65, Chelsea and Leeds had a three way tussle for the league title with Manchester United and met in a league match at Stamford Bridge in September 1964. The Yorkshire Evening Post's reporter observed that "'Never mind the ball' seemed to be the order of the day as scything, irresponsible tackles ruffled tempers." Bobby Collins "viciously" retaliated against Ron Harris and a McCreadie tackle on Giles saw Giles leave the field on a stretcher, reducing Leeds to ten men for the remainder of the match. In 1966, the teams met in an FA Cup fourth round tie, where a crowd of 57,000 saw Chelsea win 1–0 with a goal from Bobby Tambling, a game in which "the young Chelsea team withstood an almost continuous battering from Leeds."

The rivalry intensified when they met in the FA Cup again a year later, this time a semi-final at Villa Park, which Chelsea won 1–0. In a game with "frighteningly ruthless" tackling, Leeds goalkeeper Gary Sprake kicked Chelsea midfielder John Boyle in the face as they challenged for a high ball, a grudge which still remained when the teams met in the FA Cup final three years later. Further controversy came when Leeds had two late goals disallowed; a Terry Cooper strike was ruled out for offside, and a long range Peter Lorimer goal was disallowed because a free kick had been taken too quickly. Opinions on the offside decision were mixed, although Docherty conceded he would not have complained had the second goal been allowed to stand. Six months later, Leeds gained revenge by beating managerless Chelsea (Docherty had resigned the previous day) 7–0 at Elland Road, their biggest ever win in the fixture.

1970s
The clubs would meet six times during the 1969–70 season. Leeds won both league games, 2–0 at Elland Road and 5–2 at Stamford Bridge. The match at Elland Road on 20 September 1969 continued in the same vein as previous encounters. A Yorkshire Post journalist lamented the many "late and early tackles" and condemned the teams for playing "venomously". During the match Allan Clarke, Jack Charlton, David Webb, Peter Houseman, Ron Harris and Alan Birchenall all suffered injuries which ruled them out of subsequent matches. Chelsea gained a measure of revenge by knocking Leeds out of the League Cup after a replay. The teams also met in the 1970 FA Cup Final, the game which cemented the rivalry.

Chelsea and Leeds contested the FA Cup final at Wembley on 11 April 1970. Leeds were generally regarded as the better team on the day and led twice but a late Chelsea equaliser from Ian Hutchinson took the game to a replay, the first in an FA Cup final since 1912. The replay at Old Trafford attracted a UK television audience of 28 million, making it the sixth most-watched television broadcast in British history. It is regarded as one of the dirtiest football matches ever. Harris was detailed to mark Wembley Man of the Match Eddie Gray; a series of Harris fouls during the first half effectively immobilised the Scot. Elsewhere, Charlton kneed and headbutted Osgood, Hunter and Hutchinson traded punches, and Eddie McCreadie flattened Billy Bremner with a "kung fu" challenge. Bonetti was injured after being bundled into the net by Jones and limped through the rest of the match with a heavily bandaged knee.

Modern day referee David Elleray reviewed the match years later and concluded that he would have issued six red cards and twenty yellow cards. However, referee Eric Jennings only booked one player – Hutchinson – over the two games. Hugh McIlvanney wrote that "at times it appeared that Mr Jennings would give a free kick only on production of a death certificate". Mick Jones put Leeds ahead again, but Osgood equalised with 12 minutes remaining. Chelsea eventually prevailed 2–1 after extra time. Charlton was so angry at the loss that he left the pitch without collecting his runners-up medal. Charlton later said: "It wasn't the losing of the game, it was the losing of the game to Chelsea, because there were never two more competitive sides when we played each other over a period of four or five years." The match has been cited as one of the greatest FA Cup finals.

The mutual animosity continued into the 1970s. Geoffrey Green of The Times reported that a hard-fought 0–0 draw at Stamford Bridge in December 1971 at times "more resembled some Mafia vendetta than football". A crowd of 51,000 (with a further 9,000 locked out) watched a 4–0 Chelsea win over Leeds in the opening match of the 1972–73 season. The match was "marred by a string of infringements"; Trevor Cherry, Chris Garland and Terry Yorath were all booked, and Leeds lost David Harvey and Mick Jones to injury. Crowd trouble and pitch invasions led Chelsea to erect wire fences around the terraces.

1980–present
By the end of the 1970s both clubs were in decline and would spend many of the ensuing years in the Second Division. Chelsea were relegated in 1975 and again in 1979. Leeds were relegated in 1982, and would not regain their First Division status for the next eight years. No longer challenging for trophies (but frequently competing for promotion), the rivalry often continued off the pitch in the form of hooliganism. When the teams met in the Second Division in the 1982–83 season, their first match for four seasons, 153 Leeds and Chelsea hooligans were arrested after fighting broke out at Piccadilly Circus tube station on the London Underground, and another 60 were arrested at the match itself. In April 1984, when Chelsea beat Leeds 5–0 to clinch promotion to the First Division, Chelsea fans invaded the pitch several times, and Leeds fans smashed up the Stamford Bridge scoreboard. Clashes between rival fans resulted in 41 arrests. More recently, before a Chelsea-Leeds match in 2002 then-Leeds manager David O'Leary urged fans to behave after recent crowd trouble at other matches although stricter policing and the introduction of CCTV in grounds and all-seater stadia in the 1990s means that crowd trouble at matches is now generally rare.

Both clubs enjoyed another revival in the 1990s, which coincided with a series of "ill-tempered and highly-charged" clashes as "the mutual loathing that characterized these sides three decades ago... resurfaced." In an "X-rated" 0–0 draw in December 1997, eight players were booked and Leeds had two players – Gary Kelly and Alfie Haaland – sent off. Martin Lipton called the match "a throwback to the worst excesses of the Revie era when the likes of Chopper Harris kicked lumps out of Johnny Giles and Co." Another 0–0 draw in October 1998 resulted in 12 yellow cards and a red card for Chelsea's Frank Leboeuf. In a 2–0 Leeds win at Stamford Bridge in December 1999, Leeds' Lee Bowyer was booked a minute into the game and Leboeuf was again sent off. A bad tempered League Cup fourth round match in November 2001 – their first cup clash since 1970 – saw Chelsea win 2–0, with Eiður Guðjohnsen scoring a goal while Stephen McPhail was on the ground injured. Graeme Le Saux was later stretchered off after being hit in the face by Alan Smith.

The clubs did not meet in the league after Leeds' relegation from the Premier League in the 2003–04 season until Leeds' promotion from the EFL Championship in the 2019-20 season. Their last meeting took place on 15 May 2004, with Chelsea winning 1–0. The animosity between the clubs has still been expressed in the hostility of Leeds fans to the club being taken over by former Chelsea owner and chairman Ken Bates, and to the appointment of former Chelsea captain Dennis Wise as manager in 2006, resulting in chants like "Get the Chelsea out of Leeds." Gus Poyet, another former Chelsea player who served as Wise's assistant at Leeds, later commented that "The fans didn't want us there because of the rivalry with Chelsea."

The two were drawn to play each other in the League Cup in December 2012 at Elland Road, which was the first competitive meeting between them in eight years. After a goal by Leeds striker Luciano Becchio which put the West Yorkshire side ahead in the first half, Chelsea responded by scoring five in the second half, with the final score being 5–1 to Chelsea. Due to police concerns over potential crowd trouble, Chelsea were only allocated 3000 tickets rather than the usual 5000. The match drew a gate of 33,816, Leeds' highest attendance for two years.

The clubs met again in the 2020–21 Premier League season following Leeds’ promotion from the EFL Championship. The first match between them ended 3–1 to Chelsea, and the reverse fixture ended with a 0-0 draw at Elland Road.

The two teams first encounter in the 2022-23 Premier League season was a 3-0 win to Leeds at Elland Road, the Yorkshire sides first win against Chelsea since 2002.

Notable matches
Leeds United 7–0 Chelsea (7 October 1967)
Six months after the heated FA Cup semi-final at Villa Park, Leeds notched their biggest ever win over Chelsea. Chelsea entered the match in turmoil, their manager Tommy Docherty having resigned the day before. Albert Johanneson opened the scoring after five minutes and Leeds were 3–0 up within 14 minutes thanks to further goals from Jimmy Greenhoff and Jack Charlton. Peter Lorimer put Leeds 4–0 ahead by half-time. After the break, Eddie Gray beat Bonetti from outside the area, Marvin Hinton scored an own goal and Leeds captain Billy Bremner capped his man of the match performance by scoring the seventh himself.
Chelsea 5–0 Leeds United (28 April 1984)
In the Second Division, John Neal's high-flying Chelsea met mid-table Leeds, managed by Eddie Gray and fielding two survivors from the 1970 FA Cup Final, David Harvey and Peter Lorimer, knowing a win would secure promotion to the First Division for the first time since 1979. In Chelsea's first win over Leeds since 1972, winger Mickey Thomas put Chelsea ahead, Kerry Dixon scored a "perfect" hat-trick and Paul Canoville completed the win with a goal in stoppage time. At the end of the match Chelsea fans invaded the pitch, while Leeds fans trashed the scoreboard.
Leeds United 1–5 Chelsea (19 December 2012)
Chelsea and Leeds' first game against each other in eight years was in League Cup quarter finals in the 2012–13 season. Chelsea were in the Premier League at this time and Leeds were in the Championship. Chelsea ran out winners after going behind to a Luciano Becchio goal eight minutes before half time, however Juan Mata's goal one minute after half time set Chelsea on their way to the last four. Branislav Ivanović, Victor Moses, Eden Hazard and Fernando Torres wrapped up victory for the Blues.

Leeds United 3-0 Chelsea (21 August 2022)

Leeds’ first victory against Chelsea since their return to the Premier League in 2020 was a memorable one as they continued their fine unbeaten start to the season with a crushing victory at Elland Road. New summer signing Brenden Aaronson began the scoring as he capitalised on a mistake from Chelsea goalkeeper, Edouard Mendy. Soon after, Leeds went two in front after Spanish striker Rodrigo headed in a Jack Harrison free kick. The two players combined again in the second half with Rodrigo teeing up Harrison to smash home from close-range to make it 3-0. Chelsea’s summer signing Kalidou Koulibaly was sent off for a second bookable offence to complete Chelsea’s misery.

Statistics

Head to head summary

Scorelines
Biggest win:
Chelsea 7–1 Leeds United (Saturday 16 March 1935)
Leeds United 7–0 Chelsea (Saturday 7 October 1967)

Head-to-head results

Honours

Player transfers
There have been few direct player transfers between Chelsea and Leeds United. The first came in 1991, when left-back Tony Dorigo moved from Chelsea to Leeds for £1.3 million. Chelsea have never bought a senior player from Leeds, although they did controversially sign Leeds youth players Tom Taiwo and Michael Woods in 2006. Duncan McKenzie, Mickey Thomas, Vinnie Jones, Mikael Forssell, Terry Phelan, David Hopkin, David Rocastle, Jimmy Floyd Hasselbaink, Tore André Flo and Patrick Bamford have also played for both clubs. Additionally, three former Chelsea players have managed Leeds; George Graham, Terry Venables and Dennis Wise.

From Chelsea to Leeds United

Footnotes and references

Leeds United
Chelsea
England football derbies